The 2014 South Korea floods were a series of floods in late August 2014 caused by heavy rainfall around the Honam and Yeongnam. This flood season killed about 10 people, and caused many accidents during 18 August to 25 August. In some places, The rain fell over 50 mm in an hour.

Cause of the rainfall 
Primarily, the Jangma and other heavy rain seasons occur during June to July. But this rain occurred in August because the heavy rainfall moved to South Korea.

August 18 
The heavy rainfall passed between North Pacific High and Siberian High, so the rain started to fall on Honam and Jeju Island. In Yeonggwang, nine houses were flooded because of the rain, and many other accidents occurred. A few hours later, the cloud moved to the Yeongnam. There were many accidents and records in Yeongnam: 284.5 mm of precipitation in Yangsan, a sand-collapsing accident in Geoje,  and two collapsing accidents in Busan.

Precipitation records 
 Daily precipitation
 Yangsan 284.5 mm
 Busan 249 mm
 Gochang 230.6 mm
 Ulsan 211 mm
 Jeongeup 193 mm
 Hourly precipitation
 Yeonggwang 59.5 mm
 Yangsan 50 mm
 Ulsan 48.3 mm
 Suncheon 47.5 mm
 Gimhae 35.5 mm

August 20 
The rainfall weakened on August 19, so there was less precipitation except in Jeju island, Gangwon and Gyeongbuk. But it strengthened the next day, so rain fell in Jeju island and South Sea seaside. The rain was less than on August 18, but many accidents occurred because the ground was weakened.

August 21 
On August 21, the rain was expanded to Gyeonggi and Gangwon because the rainfall moved north. A reservoir in Yeongcheon was destroyed because of the rain, and in Daegu, one child disappeared, and another died because the river overflowed.

August 25

Flooding of the bus 
At 14:20, the bus in the Masanhappo-gu was flooded. It was going to the Jindong-Pachulso, but the road was restricted because of the rain, so the bus took the detour to farm road. In the process of detouring, the bus fell into the overflowed stream. Seven people on the bus perished.

See also
 2011 Seoul floods
 2014 Hiroshima landslides

2014 floods in Asia
Floods in South Korea
2014 disasters in South Korea
History of Busan